During the first years of aviation, pilots started wearing leather flying helmets as a form of protection from the cold and the noise of aircraft engines. Leather was becoming a popular choice for protective gear with the rise of motor sport and aviation at the start of the 1900s. It has many advantages that made it the ideal material for flying helmets. It is warm, durable, impermeable to liquids therefore waterproof, flexible and can be cut to curve around the head. It is wind-proof and has the great advantage of not accumulating dust. It was also found that leather helmets offered a level of protection against fire.
British Engineers led by Charles Edmond Prince added Throat microphones & earphones into these helmets during World War I for hands free communications in the noisy and windy environment of aircraft cockpits.

Perhaps the most iconic design of early leather flying helmet was known as the Type B helmet. This was designed to accommodate earphones in pockets in the ear-flaps and was easy to wear with oxygen masks and goggles. A detailed description of a typical Type B helmet can be found on the website of The Imperial War Museum (London, England). It is made from six vertical panels which meet at a central ridge panel running from front to back. There is a rectangular horizontal panel which goes across the forehead and it includes padded leather oval housings at the ears. The chinstrap, also made of leather, is stitched to the right side and buckled  to a small strap on the left. The brown leather of the helmet is lined with buff-coloured chamois and has a rectangular length of brown-coloured material sewn to the inside of the forehead.

A particularly fine example of a Type B flying helmet can be found in the Thinktank, The Science museum for Birmingham, England. That helmet belonged to a female pilot, Helen Kerly who was a Spitfire delivery pilot during the Second World War. The Type B flying helmet was designed to accommodate the addition of earphones for radio communication, but unlike later models did not include integrated wiring. Similarly, the helmet was styled to be comfortably worn with an oxygen mask and separate goggles to protect the eyes. Protection from head injuries was not considered, the leather is soft and flexible not hard to withstand blows.

There were many female pilots in the early part of the 1900s who wore the same design of protective clothing, including helmets, as their male counterparts. The leather helmets and jackets, the goggles and boots allowed the women to function as pilots in the same terms as men. Manufacturers of early flying helmets were Alfred Dunhill Ltd. and Gamages of London, England, and Roold in Paris

References 

Helmets
Aircrew clothing